Gornji Ključarovci is a settlement in the Slovene Hills northwest of Ormož in northeastern Slovenia. It belongs to the Municipality of Sveti Tomaž, which became an independent municipality in 2006. The area traditionally belonged to the Styria region and is now included in the Drava Statistical Region.

Notable people
Notable people that were born or lived in Gornji Ključarovci include:
Franc Ksaver Meško (1874–1964), writer

References

External links
Gornji Ključarovci on Geopedia

Populated places in the Municipality of Sveti Tomaž